Platypatrobus is a genus of ground beetles in the family Carabidae. This genus has a single species, Platypatrobus lacustris. It is found in North America.

References

External links

 

Carabidae